North Plains is a city in Washington County, Oregon, United States, off U.S. 26 on the northwest outskirts of the Portland metropolitan area. The population was 3,441 at the 2020 census.

History
Pioneer settlers first arrived in the North Plains area in the 1840s.
The area to be known as the city of North Plains was platted in September 1910 by the Ruth Trust Company of Portland. They purchased area tracts after James J. Hill planned to extend United Railways there.

On June 25, 1963, North Plains voted 90 to 56 to incorporate as a city; at the time the population was around 500.

Pumpkin Ridge Golf Club is just outside town. David Duval won the Nike Tour Championship there in 1993, and it was home to the U.S. Women's Open in 1997 and 2003. Horning's Hideout within the North Plains area was home to Faerieworlds Festival 2004. Pumpkin Ridge Golf Club has become a center of controversy since agreeing to host the first U.S. golf tournament on American soil of LIV Golf , the tour backed by bin Salman and Saudi Arabia’s Public Investment Fund.

Geography

Climate
This region has warm, dry summers, with no monthly average temperatures above . However, temperatures are often above  for several days each year. According to the Köppen Climate Classification system, North Plains has a warm-summer Mediterranean climate, abbreviated "Csb" on climate maps.

Demographics

2010 census
As of the census of 2010, there were 1,947 people (a 21.3% increase from 2000), 706 households, and 511 families living in the city. The racial makeup of the city was 89.0% White, 0.4% African American, 1.2% Native American, 1.8% Asian, 0.6% Pacific Islander, 3.1% from other races, and 3.7% from two or more races. Hispanic or Latino of any race were 11.0% of the population.

There were 706 households, of which 40.8% had children under the age of 18 living with them, 58.5% were married couples living together, 9.3% had a female householder with no husband present, 4.5% had a male householder with no wife present, and 27.6% were non-families. 21.8% of all households were made up of individuals, and 9.2% had someone living alone who was 65 years of age or older. The average household size was 2.75 and the average family size was 3.21.

The median age in the city was 36.5 years. 27.5% of residents were under the age of 18; 7.2% were between the ages of 18 and 24; 28.6% were from 25 to 44; 27.3% were from 45 to 64; and 9.2% were 65 years of age or older. The gender makeup of the city was 49.6% male and 50.4% female.

2000 census
As of the census of 2000, there were 1,605 people, 594 households, and 422 families living in the city. The population density was 2,044.7 people per square mile (794.5/km). There were 633 housing units at an average density of 806.4 per square mile (313.3/km). The racial makeup of the city was 90.78% White, 1.87% Asian, 1.68% Native American, 0.12% African American, 0.12% Pacific Islander, 2.74% from other races, and 2.68% from two or more races. Hispanic or Latino of any race were 7.10% of the population.  On a percentage basis, North Plains is among the top 100 locations (with at least 500 residents) home to Panamanian Americans.

There were 594 households, out of which 40.9% had children under the age of 18 living with them, 58.8% were married couples living together, 8.8% had a female householder with no husband present, and 28.8% were non-families. 25.6% of all households were made up of individuals, and 12.1% had someone living alone who was 65 years of age or older. The average household size was 2.70 and the average family size was 3.24.

In the city, the population was spread out, with 30.0% under the age of 18, 5.6% from 18 to 24, 35.0% from 25 to 44, 18.8% from 45 to 64, and 10.7% who were 65 years of age or older. The median age was 34 years. For every 100 females, there were 97.7 males. For every 100 females age 18 and over, there were 92.3 males.

The median income for a household in the city was $49,563, and the median income for a family was $55,156. Males had a median income of $42,237 versus $27,857 for females. The per capita income for the city was $18,794. About 4.8% of families and 5.3% of the population were below the poverty line, including 3.8% of those under age 18 and 15.8% of those age 65 or over.

Politics

Politically, North Plains is competitive. Precinct 330, which comprises the entirety of the city, voted 52% to 44% for Democrat Joe Biden over Republican Donald Trump in the 2020 election, after voting for Trump over Hillary Clinton 44% to 41% in 2016.

See also
Washington County Fire District 2

References

External links
 
 Entry for North Plains in the Oregon Blue Book
 North Plains Public Library
 North Plains Chamber of Commerce

Cities in Oregon
Cities in Washington County, Oregon
Portland metropolitan area
1910 establishments in Oregon
Populated places established in 1910